Joachim Westphal (of Eisleben), a contemporary of Joachim Westphal (of Hamburg), with whom he is often confused, and belonging also to the Gnesio-Lutheran party. He was ordained a preacher at Nausitz near Artern in 1553, then served as diaconus in Sangerhausen and finally as preacher in Gerbstedt in the county of Mansfeld, where he died in 1569. He wrote  (1563);  (1565);  (1568);  (1568).

References

Westphal, Joachim (of Eisleben)
German Lutheran theologians
16th-century German Lutheran clergy
Year of birth unknown
16th-century German Protestant theologians
German male non-fiction writers
16th-century German male writers